Mohammed bin Ali bin Mohammed Al Barwani (born October 30, 1951) is an Omani billionaire businessman, the founder and chairman of MB Holding Group of companies, which operate in oil and gas exploration and production, oilfield services, engineering and mining.

Early life
Mohammed Al Barwani was born in Oman. In 1975 he received a bachelor's degree in Science from Miami University, Ohio, US, and  a "Bachelor of Science degree in Chemical Engineering from the University of Texas at Austin in 1981". 
In 1980, he was awarded a master degree and in 2010 received an honorary doctorate in petroleum engineering from Heriot-Watt University in Edinburgh, UK, yet styles himself as "Dr. Mohammed Al Barwani".

Career
Barwani started his career in the oil industry as a reservoir engineer for Petroleum Development Oman (PDO), a joint venture of Shell and the Government of Oman, where he worked from 1976 to 1986.

Barwani founded MB Holding in 1982 to provide oilfield services. MB expanded into oil and gas exploration and production, and then engineering services and subsequently founded Mawarid Mining in 1987 and Petrogas in 1999. In 1997 he acquired KC Drilling in Hungary, in 2000, Erdol-Edgas Workover in Germany, and in 2004 United Engineering Services, in Oman. He also acquired Hyspec in the United Kingdom, in 2012.

Barwani owns the Dutch yacht builder Oceanco. He first visited the company in 2009, and acquired it from Greek businessman Theodore Angelopoulos in 2010. In 2015, Barwani bought the Turkish shipyard Turquoise Yachts. He runs Musstir, a property developer with "stakes in several hotels in Oman".

Barwani is a non-executive director of a number of publicly traded and joint stock companies, Al Madina Insurance co. SAOG, Al Madina Investments SAOG (Muscat Stock Market), Nautilus Minerals. He was formerly a non-executive director of Oman Air, Shell Oman Marketing Company, Taageer Leasing Company, Oman, and National Bank of Oman. He is a member of the International SeaKeepers Society.

Barwani was included in the book Those Who Inspire Oman, published in November 2012 by the publishing house Those Who Inspire Ltd.

As of May 2016, Forbes estimated his net worth at US$1.01 billion.

In 2020, Barwani was appointed as chairman of Oman Air the national airline of Oman.

Personal life
He is married to Sharifa al Harthy, who has always been involved in the company, and she is deputy chairman of MB Holding. They live in Muscat, and have five children, all of whom work for MB Holding.

Barwani owns several boats, with the 32 metre yacht Sharifa being the largest.

References

1950s births
Living people
Omani billionaires
Omani businesspeople
Omani engineers
Omani expatriates in the United Kingdom
Omani expatriates in the United States
Miami University alumni
Alumni of Heriot-Watt University
People from Muscat, Oman